Kota Vamsa was a medieval dynasty which ruled in parts of the modern-day Indian state of Andhra Pradesh. The Kotas belonged to Dhananjaya gotra. Kota chiefs ruled Kammanadu with Dharanikota as capital. Kota Kings belonged to the Shudra varna.

References

Telugu monarchs
Dynasties of India
Hindu dynasties